Norman Henson (3 March 1950 – April 2014) was a Filipino gymnast. He competed in five events at the 1968 Summer Olympics.

References

External links
 

1950 births
2014 deaths
Filipino male artistic gymnasts
Olympic gymnasts of the Philippines
Gymnasts at the 1968 Summer Olympics
Sportspeople from Pampanga